The 2000 Abierto Mexicano Pegaso was a men's tennis tournament played on outdoor clay courts in Mexico City, Mexico that was part of the International Series Gold category of the 2000 ATP Tour. It was the seventh edition of the tournament and was held from 21 February through 27 February 2000. Unseeded Juan Ignacio Chela, who entered the main draw as a qualifier, won the singles title.

Finals

Singles

 Juan Ignacio Chela defeated  Mariano Puerta, 6–4, 7–6(7–4)
 It was Chela's first singles title of his career.

Doubles

 Byron Black /  Donald Johnson defeated  Gastón Etlis /  Martín Rodríguez, 6–3, 7–5

References

Abierto Mexicano Telcel
Mexican Open (tennis)
2000 in Mexican tennis
February 2000 sports events in Mexico